The Indian Industrial School at Genoa, Nebraska, United States was the fourth non-reservation boarding institution established by the Office of Indian Affairs. The facility was completed in 1884 and operated until 1934.  Now restored, it is owned and operated by a foundation as the Genoa U.S. Indian School Museum.  The building is listed on the National Register of Historic Places.

About
The facility opened on February 20, 1884, and, like other such schools, its mission was to educate and teach Christianity and European-American culture to Native American children for assimilation. The village of Genoa, Nebraska was selected because the Federal Government already owned the former Pawnee Reservation property there; however, existing buildings at the site were unsuitable and in poor repair. The Pawnee had been removed to Indian Territory in 1879.

Like many buildings designed for Indian school campuses, the main building was a simple three-story structure with a hipped roof and a small triangular pediment above the center entrance. The pairs of tall windows and the strong horizontal lines across the front created a balanced composition. The building extended at length from its front facade. This was a popular design during the late 1880s.

The school expanded, eventually enrolling Native American children from ten states and over 20 tribes. In time the school grew from the original 74 students to an enrollment of 599.  It encompassed more than 30 buildings on 640 acres.  The US government closed the school in 1934, during the Great Depression.

At least 102 children died at the school, as a result of abuse and neglect, though the true death toll is likely higher. Common causes of death were influenza, tuberculosis, pneumonia, and heart failure. Accidental shootings, paralysis, and a freight car accident also occurred, though some may not have been accidents but suicides.

Genoa U.S. Indian School Museum
The Genoa US Indian School Foundation purchased the Manual Training building of the school from the town of Genoa, restored it and now operates the facility as the Genoa U.S. Indian School Museum.

Gallery

See also
 Native American tribes in Nebraska

References

External links 
 Genoa Museums - includes information about visiting the museum
 
 Welcome to Genoa, Nebraska: History

Educational institutions established in 1884
Native American history of Nebraska
School buildings on the National Register of Historic Places in Nebraska
Defunct schools in Nebraska
Education museums in the United States
Native American museums in Nebraska
Ethnic museums in Nebraska
Museums in Nance County, Nebraska
National Register of Historic Places in Nance County, Nebraska
1884 establishments in Nebraska
Native American boarding schools